Allenfarm is an unincorporated community in Brazos County, in the U.S. state of Texas. According to the Handbook of Texas, the community had a population of 30 in 2000. It is located within the Bryan-College Station metropolitan area.

History
Allenfarm was first settled by a second group of colonists brought by Stephen F. Austin between 1821 and 1831. Land grants were originally bought by Jarrell and Robert H. Millican. Allenfarm was named for Robert A. Allen, who owned a plantation in the area, but does not appear on any of the land deeds. A post office was established at Allenfarm in 1885 and remained in operation until after 1940. The community had a three-story depot, two gins, a general store, a commissary, and three saloons serving 100 residents in 1902. The population went down to 75 in the 1940s and had two stores, a church, and two factories. Its population dropped to 15 in 1964 but grew to 40 in 1970. There was only one business in the community in 1986 and the owner, Will Terrell, preserved several buildings in the area. The population was 30 in 2000.

Geography

Education
Allenfarm had two schools in the 1940s. Today, the community is served by the Navasota Independent School District.

References

Unincorporated communities in Brazos County, Texas
Unincorporated communities in Texas